Witold Rudziński (14 March 1913, in Sebezh, Russian Empire – 29 February 2004) was a Polish composer, conductor, and author.

He studied composition at the Mieczysław Karlowicz Conservatory of Music in Vilnius, and later at the Gregorian Institute in Paris. His teachers included Tadeusz Szeligowski, Stanisław Szpinalski, Nadia Boulanger, and Charles Koechlin.

In addition to composing, Rudziński taught at the Vilnius Conservatory of Music and in Poland at  the Conservatory of Music in Lodz and the F. Chopin Academy of Music in Warsaw. Composer Iwonka Bogumila Szymanska was one of his students.

References

External links
Biographical information and List of Works

1913 births
2004 deaths
Polish composers
Polish conductors (music)
Male conductors (music)
Academic staff of the Chopin University of Music
20th-century conductors (music)
20th-century male musicians
People from Sebezh